The Tenth Oklahoma Legislature was a meeting of the legislative branch of the government of Oklahoma, composed of the Oklahoma Senate and the Oklahoma House of Representatives. The state legislature met in Oklahoma City, in regular session from January 6 to March 28, 1925, during the term of Governor Martin Trapp.

The 1925 session was marked by the creation of the state's top investigative law enforcement agency, which is today known as the Oklahoma State Bureau of Investigation.

Dates of sessions
Regular session: January 6-March 28, 1925
Previous: 9th Legislature • Next: 11th Legislature

Major legislation
The Oklahoma Legislature passed legislation to create the Bureau of Criminal Identification in 1925, which today is known as the Oklahoma State Bureau of Investigation.

Party composition

Senate

House of Representatives

Leadership
William J. Holloway served as President pro tempore of the Oklahoma Senate in 1925. J.B. Harper served as Speaker of the Oklahoma House of Representatives.

Members

Senate

Table based on state almanac and list of all senators.

House of Representatives

Table based on government database.

References

External links
Oklahoma Legislature
Oklahoma House of Representatives
Oklahoma Senate

Oklahoma legislative sessions
1925 in Oklahoma
1926 in Oklahoma
1925 U.S. legislative sessions
1926 U.S. legislative sessions